Abdelfatah Aftha Safi (born May 23, 1981) is a French footballer of Moroccan origin who is currently playing for Sabah FA in the 2013 Malaysia Premier League.

Abdulfatah was born in Meaux, a small commune in the Seine-et-Marne department in the Île-de-France region to Moroccan parents. Abdulfatah started his career with AS Poissy at the age of 20.

As an attacking midfielder, Abdelfatah Safi had played for several clubs in different countries such as AS Poissy in France, Najran in Saudi Arabia, Al-Salmiya SC in Kuwait and Al-Najma in Bahrain.

After a successful trial, Safi joined Kedah FA, a team playing in the Malaysia Super League, in 2012. He was not retained by Kedah for the 2013 season, but joined another Malaysian team, Sabah FA in 2013.

References

External links

Expatriate footballers in Malaysia
1981 births
Living people
Expatriate footballers in Kuwait
Expatriate footballers in Saudi Arabia
Expatriate footballers in Bahrain
French footballers
Kedah Darul Aman F.C. players
Sabah F.C. (Malaysia) players
Najran SC players
French expatriate sportspeople in Malaysia
French expatriate sportspeople in Bahrain
French expatriate sportspeople in Saudi Arabia
AS Poissy players
Saudi Professional League players
Association football midfielders
Al Salmiya SC players
Kuwait Premier League players
Pacy Ménilles RC players
Entente SSG players
Busaiteen Club players